UISE is an initialism with several meanings:
 International Save the Children Union, also known as L'Union Internationale de Secours aux Enfants (UISE), a former international humanitarian organization that functioned between 1920 and 1986
 User interface design, sometimes known as "User Interface Software Engineering" (UISE), a general application and appliance design principle focusing on the user's experience and interaction